Charminar Assembly constituency is a constituency of Telangana Legislative Assembly, India. It is one of 15 constituencies in capital city of Hyderabad. It is part of Hyderabad Lok Sabha constituency.

Syed Pasha Quadri won the assembly election from Charminar in 2014.

Extent of the constituency
The Assembly Constituency presently comprises the following neighbourhoods:

Members of Legislative Assembly

Election results

Telangana Assembly Elections, 2018

Telangana Assembly Elections, 2014

References

See also
 Charminar
 List of constituencies of Telangana Legislative Assembly

Assembly constituencies of Telangana